The 2023 USF2000 Championship presented by Cooper Tires is the fourteenth season of the USF2000 Championship since its revival in 2010. When the top rung of the Road to Indy ladder system, Indy Lights, was bought by Penske Entertainment (owners of INDYCAR) in 2021 and the lower level series changed sanctioning to the United States Auto Club, changes were made to the other championships in the ladder. This, together with the Indy Lights being rebranded to Indy NXT, effectively ended the "Road to Indy" branding, with the three championships below Indy NXT now collectively called "USF Pro Championships Presented by Cooper Tires". The USF2000 Championship serves as the middle rung of this ladder.

Drivers and teams

 TJ Speed Motorsports took over two cars from Cape Motorsports to enter the championship in 2023, but ultimately decided against it.
 Noah Ping was signed to compete for Velocity Racing Development, but has dropped the programme and instead signed with the VRD-partnered team Arden in GB3.

Schedule 
The 2023 schedule was revealed on October 17, 2022. It features two street circuits, five road courses and one oval round. The championship will return to Sebring for the first time since 2013. All rounds except the weekends at Sebring and Indianapolis Raceway Park are scheduled to support IndyCar.

Race results

Championship standings

Drivers' Championship
Scoring system

 The driver who qualifies on pole is awarded one additional point.
 One point is awarded to the driver who leads the most laps in a race.
 One point is awarded to the driver who sets the fastest lap during the race.

Teams' championship 

 Scoring system

 Single car teams receive 3 bonus points as an equivalency to multi-car teams
 Only the best two results count for teams fielding more than two entries

See also 

 2023 IndyCar Series
 2023 Indy NXT
 2023 USF Pro 2000 Championship
 2023 USF Juniors

References 

U.S. F2000 National Championship seasons
USF2000 Championship
USF2000 Championship
USF2000 Championship
USF2000 Championship